John James Mooney better known as J. D. Mooney (died 1966) was an American jockey and trainer who won the 1924 Kentucky Derby on Black Gold and the 1929 King's Plate on Shorelint. Mooney's riding career lasted for 10 years. His record included 261 victories, 258 seconds, and 280 thirds. He was in the money 30 percent of the time. Mooney is a member of the Louisiana Sports Hall of Fame and the Fair Grounds Racing Hall of Fame. After his career as a jockey, Mooney became a trainer. He trained 1962 Canadian Horse of the Year Crafty Lace.

Mooney was a native of New Orleans. His father, John J. Mooney was a horse breeder and owner. His son John J. Mooney was a horse racing executive and a member of the Canadian Horse Racing Hall of Fame. Another son, Paul A. Mooney was the president of the Boston Bruins. His grandsons John Mooney, Daniel Mooney and Mike Mooney are also involved in thoroughbred racing.

References

1966 deaths
American horse trainers
American jockeys
Sportspeople from New Orleans
Year of birth missing